Tobia Bocchi (born 7 April 1997) is an Italian triple jumper. He competed at the 2020 Summer Olympics, in Triple jump.

Career
At the youth level, Bocchi boasts two under-20 silver medals at the 2014 Summer Youth Olympics and at the 2015 European Athletics Junior Championships.

Progression

Outdoor

Achievements
Senior level

National titles
Bocchi won 3 national championships at individual senior level.

 Italian Athletics Championships
 Triple jump: 2021
 Italian Athletics Indoor Championships
 Triple jump: 2021, 2023

See also
 Italian all-time lists - Triple jump

Notes

References

External links

1997 births
Living people
Italian male triple jumpers
Sportspeople from Parma
Athletics competitors of Centro Sportivo Carabinieri
Athletes (track and field) at the 2014 Summer Youth Olympics
Italian Athletics Championships winners
Athletes (track and field) at the 2020 Summer Olympics
Olympic athletes of Italy
Athletes (track and field) at the 2022 Mediterranean Games
Mediterranean Games medalists in athletics
Mediterranean Games silver medalists for Italy
21st-century Italian people